In the Arms of the Sea (Swedish: Bärande hav) is a 1951 Swedish drama film directed by Arne Mattsson and starring Alf Kjellin, Ulf Palme, Edvin Adolphson and Eva Dahlbeck. It was shot at the Centrumateljéerna Studios in Stockholm and on location in Gothenburg, Hamburg and Santos in Brazil. The film's sets were designed by the art director P.A. Lundgren.

Cast
 Alf Kjellin as 	Martin Winner
 Ulf Palme as 	Bo Winner
 Edvin Adolphson as 	Henry Lilja
 Bengt Eklund as Palm
 Erik Strandmark as Holger Rehnberg
 Eva Dahlbeck as 	Lucie
 Ulla Holmberg as 	Nurse Rangvi
 Märta Arbin as 	Captain's Wife
 Anne-Margrethe Björlin as 	Sonja Jacobsson
 Bengt Blomgren as 	'Stora Björn'
 Bernt Callenbo as 	Gustav Engård
 Gösta Cederlund as 	Captain
 Erich Conrad as 	Bertil Karlsson
 Doreen Denning as 	Käthi
 Berta Hall as Tovas' Mother
 Nils Hallberg as 	Nisse Melander
 Ingemar Holde as 	Moroten Pettersson
 Ulla Jacobsson as Nisse's Fiancee
 Ruth Kasdan as 	Rehnberg's Wife
 Magnus Kesster as 	Chief
 Ingvar Kjellson as 	Third Mate
 Willy Koblanck as 	Waiter
 Georg Løkkeberg as 	Sönderby
 Sten Mattsson as 	Tovas
 Robert Peiper as 	Blind Passport Forger
 Hjördis Petterson as 	Mrs. Lilja
 Lasse Sarri as Mess Boy
 Henake Schubak as Onni
 Georg Skarstedt as 	Cook
 Jan-Olof Strandberg as 	Sven-Erik Nilsson
 Harry Ahlin as 	Constable 
 Tor Borong as Captain 
 Gita Gordeladze as 	Carmencita 
 Sten Hedlund as 	Steward 
 Håkan Jahnberg as 	Dr. Larsson 
 Stig Johanson as 	Sailor 
 Olav Riégo as Doctor 
 Emy Storm as 	Girl at the Sailor's Pub 
 Gull Strindberg as 	Boatman's daughter 
 Charles White as 	Black sailor 
 Peter Winner as 	German policeman

References

Bibliography 
 Qvist, Per Olov & von Bagh, Peter. Guide to the Cinema of Sweden and Finland. Greenwood Publishing Group, 2000.

External links 
 

1951 films
Swedish drama films
1951 drama films
1950s Swedish-language films
Films directed by Arne Mattsson
Swedish black-and-white films
1950s Swedish films